Lewis William Lywood (23 December 1906 – 31 October 1971) was an English cricketer.  Lywood was a right-handed batsman who bowled right-arm fast-medium.  He was born at Caterham, Surrey.

Lywood made his first-class debut for Surrey against Oxford University in 1927.  He made a further first-class appearance for Surrey against Gloucestershire in the 1928 County Championship.  He later joined Essex, making two first-class appearances for the county in 1930 against Worcestershire and Northamptonshire.  His brief first-class career had little success, with him taking just 3 wickets at an average of 86.66, with best figures of 1/7.  With the bat, he scored 19 runs at a batting average of 3.80, with a high score of 7.

He died at Caterham, Surrey on 31 October 1971.

References

External links
Lewis Lywood at ESPNcricinfo
Lewis Lywood at CricketArchive

1906 births
1971 deaths
People from Walthamstow
Cricketers from Greater London
English cricketers
Surrey cricketers
Essex cricketers